Widgee Crossing North is a rural locality in the Gympie Region, Queensland, Australia.

Geography
The Mary River forms the western and southern boundaries.

Heritage listings 
Widgee Crossing North has the following heritage sites:

 260 Widgee Crossing Road: Former Widgee Crossing Shops

References 

Gympie Region
Localities in Queensland